Old Tupton is a village in Derbyshire, England. It is located on the A61 Derby road, near to Tupton, and to the south of Chesterfield.

External links
 
 A History of Old Tupton

References 

Villages in Derbyshire
North East Derbyshire District